The Coushatta are a Muskogean-speaking Native American people now living primarily in the U.S. states of Louisiana, Oklahoma, and Texas.

When first encountered by Europeans, they lived in the territory of present-day Tennessee, Georgia and Alabama. They were historically closely allied and intermarried with the Alabama people, also members of the Creek Confederacy. Their languages are closely related and mutually intelligible.

Under pressure from Anglo-American colonial settlement after 1763 and the French defeat in the Seven Years' War, they began to move west into Mississippi, Louisiana and Texas, which were then under Spanish rule. They became settled in these areas by the early 19th century. Some of the Coushatta and Alabama people were removed west to Indian Territory (now Oklahoma) in the 1830s under Indian Removal, together with other Muscogee (Creek) peoples.

Today, Coushatta people are enrolled in three federally recognized tribes:
 Alabama-Quassarte Tribal Town in Wetumka, Oklahoma
 Coushatta Tribe of Louisiana.
 Alabama-Coushatta Tribe of Texas

Language
The Koasati language is part of the Apalachee-Alabama-Koasati branch of the Muskogean languages. An estimated 200 people spoke the language in 2000, most of whom lived in Louisiana. The language is written in the Latin script.

History
The Coushatta were traditionally agriculturalists, growing a variety of maize, beans, and squash, and supplementing their diet by hunting game and fish.  They are known for their skill at basketry. Nearly all the Spanish expeditions (including the 1539-1543 Hernando de Soto Expedition) into the interior of Spanish Florida recorded encountering the original town of the tribe. It was believed to be located in the Tennessee River Valley. (Click here for a list of towns encountered by the Hernando de Soto Expedition.) The Spanish referred to the people as Coste, with their nearby neighbors being the Chiaha, Chiska, Yuchi, Tasquiqui, and Tali.

Under pressure from new European settlers in the 17th-18th centuries the Coushatta migrated west into present-day Alabama. Along the way they established their town at Nickajack (Ani-Kusati-yi, or Koasati-place, in Cherokee) in the current Marion County, Tennessee. Later they founded a major settlement at the north end of Long Island, which is bisected by the present-day Tennessee-Alabama stateline.

By the time of the American Revolution, the Coushatta had moved many miles down the Tennessee River where their town is recorded as Coosada.  In the 18th century, some of the Coushatta (Koasati) joined the emerging Creek Confederacy, where they became known as part of the "Upper Creek".  They were closely related to the Alabama Indians and often intermarried with them. Coushatta and Alabama who stayed in Alabama were part of the 1830s forcible removal to Indian Territory west of the Mississippi River. Today their descendants form the federally recognized Alabama-Quassarte Tribal Town in Wetumka, Oklahoma

Some of the Coushatta tribe split from the Creek Confederacy and went to South Louisiana. Their descendants today make up the federally recognized Coushatta Tribe of Louisiana.

Notable chiefs among the Coushatta-Alabama were Long King and Colita (Koasati) (1838-1852), who succeeded him. They led their people to settle in present-day Polk County, Texas in the late 18th and early 19th centuries.  Colita's Village was developed prior to the European-American settlement of Livingston, Texas. Descendants of these peoples form the federally recognized Alabama-Coushatta Tribe of Texas and have a reservation near Livingston.

Ethnobotany
A decoction of the leaves of Pseudognaphalium obtusifolium ssp. obtusifolium is used for fevers. The Coushatta use it to bathe those who are feverish.

20th century to present
The Alabama-Quassarte Tribal Town in Wetumka, Oklahoma achieved federal recognition in 1939, following passage of the Oklahoma Indian Welfare Act of 1936. Its people were descendants of a community that had moved as a group from their town in Alabama to Indian Territory in the 1830s. They settled together and maintained their town identity. In addition, its people have dual citizenship in the federally recognized Muscogee Creek Nation, representing descendants of the broader Creek Confederacy. It has an enrolled population of 380.
In 1972, the Coushatta Tribe of Louisiana achieved state recognition as a tribe. A year later it gained federal recognition. The tribe has acquired  of reservation near its traditional homeland of the 18th and 19th centuries. This land is held in trust on the tribe's behalf by the United States Department of the Interior.

In the twentieth century, the Coushatta people in Louisiana began cultivating rice and crawfish on tribally owned farms on the reservation, where most of the current population resides. An estimated 200 people of the tribe still speak the Coushatta language, which is in the Muskogean family. In the early 21st century, fewer young people are learning it and the tribe is working on language preservation.

Since the late 20th century and the rise in Indian self-determination, many Native American tribes have developed a new source of revenues by establishing gaming casinos on their reservations, which are sovereign territory. States, which had begun their own gaming operations and regulated private ones, and the federal government have passed legislation to control Indian gaming, which must conform to what exists by state law. While such revenues are not taxable by the states, tribes often negotiate agreements with the states to share some portion of income, in recognition of their reliance on state infrastructure and other assets. In the 1990s, the Coushatta of Louisiana hired the lobbyist Jack Abramoff to assist in establishing a gaming casino on their reservation. They were victims of his manipulations, as he charged them high fees but did not work on their behalf to gain federal or state approval of such development. He was ultimately prosecuted for his actions.

Since then, the tribe has established gaming on its reservation. It also has tax-free sales of certain items to raise revenues.  The initiatives have raised significant revenues, but the state filed suit to stop the specific class of gaming. Litigation is underway.

F. A. Little, Jr., of Alexandria, Louisiana, a retired United States District Judge for the Western District of Louisiana, serves as chief judge for the tribe.

The Alabama-Coushatta Tribe of Texas achieved federal recognition in 1987. It has acquired a  reservation near Livingston, Texas, its homeland since settling in this area in the early 19th century. It has 1,100 enrolled members.

References

External links 

Alabama-Quassarte Tribal Town, official site
Alabama-Coushatta Tribe of Texas, official site
Coushatta Tribe of Louisiana, official site

 
Native American tribes in Alabama
Native American tribes in Louisiana
Native American tribes in Texas
Native American tribes in Oklahoma
Indigenous peoples of the Southeastern Woodlands
Native American tribes in Georgia (U.S. state)
Native American tribes in Tennessee